Hoover Orsi Pereira Martins (born May 16, 1978 in Campo Grande, Mato Grosso do Sul) is a Brazilian race car driver. He began his professional career in 1998 in the European Formula Renault series where he captured 4th place. He returned to South America where he was the South American Formula 3 champion in 1999. 2000 brought him to the United States to compete in Toyota Atlantic where he finished 7th in his rookie season. In 2001 he switched teams to Hylton Motorsports and captured 5 wins on his way to the championship. However, in 2002 very few opportunities existed to move up to the Champ Car series and Orsi was left without a ride. In 2005 he made his Stock Car Brasil debut and captured 3 wins and finished 3rd in the championship. In 2006 he split time between Stock Car Brasil where he finished 3rd, but without any wins, and a frustrating partial season in the Cheever Racing Grand-Am Rolex Sports Car Series Daytona Prototype with teammate Christian Fittipaldi. In 2008 Orsi finished Stock Car championship in the 23rd position, 2008 was the last full-time season of Orsi in the category. After one year far of races, in 2011, Hoover returned on the Trofeo Linea Brasil, but, abandoned the category after losing his sponsorship. Orsi also competing in some races of the TC 2000 Championship.

Racing record

Career summary

Complete Stock Car Brasil results

External links

1978 births
Living people
People from Campo Grande
Brazilian racing drivers
Stock Car Brasil drivers
TC 2000 Championship drivers
Rolex Sports Car Series drivers
Atlantic Championship drivers
Formula 3 Sudamericana drivers
British Formula Renault 2.0 drivers
Sportspeople from Mato Grosso do Sul
Cheever Racing drivers
Fortec Motorsport drivers
Manor Motorsport drivers
RC Motorsport drivers